Shala is an Albanian surname. It may refer to:

 Drilon Shala (born 1987), Kosovar-Finnish footballer
 Endrit Shala (born 1981), Kosovar politician
 Herolind Shala (born 1992), Albania born Kosovar-Norwegian footballer
 Klodiana Shala (born 1979), Albanian athlete
 Kujtim Shala (born 1964), Kosovar Croatian footballer
Andis Shala (born 1988), Albania born Kosovar-German footballer, son of Kujtim
 Rijat Shala (born 1983), Kosovar-Swiss footballer
 Shkëlzen Shala (born 1983), Albanian entrepreneur and veganism activist

See also

Sharla

Albanian-language surnames
Toponymic surnames